The Green National Convention is the presidential nominating convention of the Green Party of the United States (GPUS).  Though the Green National Committee (GNC) meets annually in a "national meeting", the convention is convened by the GNC once every four years in order to nominate an official candidate in the upcoming U.S. presidential election, and to officially adopt the party platform and rules for the election cycle.

The convention signals the end of the primary season for Greens, and the start of campaigning for the general election of that year; as such, prominent Greens in state and local races are also spotlighted in order to give them the publicity that the convention affords.  In contrast to the Republican and Democratic National Conventions, however, the convention is not merely a formality which endorses the will of the electorate in the primaries, but the final determinant for the nomination.  This is because ballot access laws in many states prohibit the Green Party from holding a state-sponsored primary election—only five states were able to meet the requirements in 2004—and others prevent voters from actually registering into the party, thus making it difficult to credential Greens.

As such, Green conventions often have a degree of contentiousness which was seen only in past conventions of the Democratic and Republican Parties, prior to reforms in 1968 and 1972, respectively.

History
The leadership of the first nationwide Green organization in the United States, The Greens/Green Party USA (G/GPUSA), were generally opposed to an entry into electoral politics.  Thus, the G/GPUSA's national meeting in Albuquerque, New Mexico, in 1995 ended with a resolution not to nominate a candidate for the 1996 election.  However, a group of Greens interested in a run by consumer advocate Ralph Nader met in Los Angeles in 1996 to nominate Nader for president and Winona LaDuke for vice president.  Arguably, though it lacked official sanction, this was the first nominating convention of the Green Party in the United States, and the only one with which the G/GPUSA, if only certain members, was at all involved.

Following the general election in 1996, several state Green Parties formed the Association of State Green Parties (ASGP). As such, they met in Denver, Colorado, in 2000 to once again nominate Nader and LaDuke.

In 2001, the ASGP formally adopted the name Green Party of the United States, and was recognized by the Federal Election Commission as the official National Committee of the Green Party.  The first convention under that name, in Milwaukee, Wisconsin, in 2004, was not without controversy.  Nader decided to forgo the Green nomination in favor of asking for an "endorsement" of his independent candidacy; the Greens instead nominated David Cobb for president on the second ballot from among a number of candidates, many of whom were "favorite sons", running as placeholders for Nader.  Pat LaMarche was named the vice presidential candidate.

List of Green conventions
The following is a list of United States Green Party presidential nominating conventions.

1 The 1996 meeting was not an official meeting of The Greens/Green Party USA, which had officially voted to nominate no candidate in Albuquerque in 1995.
2 Convened by the Association of State Green Parties, later to be renamed the Green Party of the United States.

Other national meetings 
In addition to the presidential nominating convention, there is a national meeting in all other years for the party. During the era of the Association of State Green Parties, separate annual meetings were held in the same year of presidential conventions. Since 2004, the presidential convention has consolidated annual meetings during presidential election years.

Green Party of the United States

Association of State Green Parties

See also 
Green National Committee
Democratic National Convention
Libertarian National Convention
Republican National Convention

References